ITV Television Playhouse, often simplified to Television Playhouse, was a British anthology television series produced by and airing on the ITV television network from 1955 through 1963. The series premiered with the teleplay Midlevel on 24 September 1955. Its final episode was the teleplay They Don't Make Summers Like They Used To which aired on 27 December 1963.

Originally airing one hour long episodes weekly on Friday nights during its first season in 1955–1956, the programme was subsequently moved to Thursday night weekly broadcasts for its second (1956–1957) and third (1957–1958) seasons. The programme moved back to weekly Friday night broadcasts for its fourth (1958–1959) and fifth (1959–1960) seasons. It returned to Thursday night weekly broadcasts for seasons 6 (1960–1961) and 7 (1961–1962). The series moved back to Friday night broadcasts for season 8 (1962–1963). Its final season, season 9 (Autumn 1963), was only half as long as the other seasons and aired on Thursday nights.

References

External links
 

1955 British television series debuts
1964 British television series endings
1950s British drama television series
1960s British drama television series
British drama television series
1950s British anthology television series
1960s British anthology television series
Black-and-white British television shows
English-language television shows